The Common Cause is a lost 1919 American silent comedy film directed and produced by J. Stuart Blackton and distributed by Vitagraph Company of America. It is based on a play, Getting Together, by Ian Hay, J. Hartley Manners, and Percival Knight.

Plot
As described in a film magazine, Helene Palmer (Breamer) is estranged from her husband Orrin (Rawlinson) due to the attentions paid to her by a man about town. After the United States enters World War I, she takes up war work and pleads with men from all walks of life on the steps of the New York City public library to enlist. Her husband joins his company and goes abroad, and she induces her male friend to also join the colors. She then goes to France where she ministers to the sick and destitute. The Germans invade the town and she remains behind with those too ill to be moved. A German officer goes to her room and is about to assault her when the American troops arrive, and she is saved by her husband. There is a reconciliation between them. The film has a prologue where actresses representing Britannia, Italy, and the United States answer the call of Belgium and France, and the film ends with an epilogue with a "league of nations" tableau.

Cast
Effie Shannon as Belgium (prologue)
Irene Castle as France (prologue)
Violet Heming as Britannia (prologue)
Julia Arthur as Italy (prologue)
Marjorie Rambeau as Columbia (prologue)
Herbert Rawlinson as Orrin Palmer
Sylvia Breamer as Helene Palmer
Huntley Gordon as Edward Wadsworth
Lawrence Grossmith as Tommy Atkins
Charles Stuart Blackton as Little Belgian Refugee
Violet Virginia Blackton as Little Belgian Refugee
Philip Van Loan as The Poilu
Marcelle Carroll as French Girl (credited as Mlle. Marcel)
Louis Dean as German General

References

External links

1919 films
American silent feature films
Lost American films
Films directed by J. Stuart Blackton
Vitagraph Studios films
American films based on plays
Films based on works by Ian Hay
American black-and-white films
1919 comedy films
Silent American comedy films
1919 lost films
Lost comedy films
1910s American films